Gaurav Bhatt is a music director, singer, songwriter, and guitarist from Jaipur, India. He has an Indian classical background and sings in the traditional Indian style. Known for his fine work in Fusion (Indian Classical + Jazz), Romantic and Instrumentals melodies.

Gaurav's popular music videos "Sun Kabhi" (launched by actress Urvashi Rautela, "Katra Katra" and "Ye Faasley" are playing on MTV India in the Indie Pop category on national television in India.
Composed songs for Kingfisher backstage and for various other channels. Accompanied Great maestros like Pt. Krishna Bhatt, Ghazal Maestros Ahmed and Mohammed Hussain, Shubha Mudgal. His band "Heat Strokes" was invited by Coke Studio.

Background

Gaurav was born in Bikaner, Rajasthan. Gaurav is a MCA from the Birla Institute of Technology, Mesra. He has worked with top IT companies like Satyam, Wipro Infotech and Appirio to name some.

Discography

References

External links
 
 
 
 
 
 
 
 
 
 
 
 

1979 births
Living people
Indian guitarists
Indian male composers
Musicians from Jaipur
Rajasthani people
Indian pop composers
21st-century guitarists
21st-century male musicians